Fântânele is a commune located in Suceava County, Western Moldavia, northeastern Romania. It is composed of five villages, namely: Bănești, Cotu Dobei, Fântânele, Slobozia, and Stamate.

Gallery

Natives 

 Dorel Bernard

References 

Communes in Suceava County
Localities in Western Moldavia